M3 Communications Group, Inc. is a company providing communications services - from public relations and public affairs to social media management, event organisation, media clippings and analysis and Web services. The company builds and maintains relations with the media, government officials and international invest.

The Team
Maxim Behar founded the company in 1994. He is a public relations expert with presence in many countries all over the world.
Maxim Behar is President of the largest PR community in the world - ICCO (International Communications Consultancy Organisation) and also Chairman of Hill+Knowlton Strategies Czech operation.

The company employs more than 75 people, serving clients in various sectors: technology, financial services, retail, food & beverage, energy, hospitality, and many more.

Divisions and associated organizations

M3 Communications Group, Inc. has been an associate of Hill & Knowlton Strategies since 2000, one of the world's largest PR companies.

In 2004, the company established M3 Communications College, a private and fully licensed college in the fields of Public Relations and Marketing. The college is affiliated with the Manhattan Institute of Management.

Headline Ltd. is a subsidiary company of M3 Communications Group, Inc., and a leading provider of professional media monitoring services in Bulgaria since 2004.

Awards
M3 Communications Group, Inc. has won various awards, including Sabre Award for Best Corporate Website in 2012, Stevie Award for Best PR Agency of the Year in Europe in 2011, The Holmes Report Eastern Consultancy of the Year in 2011, Bright Awards for Agency of the Year in 2010 and 2011, and many more. The company was also awarded by Superbrands in Bulgaria in 2006, 2007, 2009 and 2012, and in 2006/2007 was the first Bulgarian public relations company to be a finalist in the Best PR Agency category of the Stevie Awards.

References

External links
M3 Communications Group, Inc.

Service companies of Bulgaria